Laurent Pionnier (born 24 May 1982) is a French former professional footballer who played as a goalkeeper.

Honours
Montpellier
 Ligue 1: 2011–12

References

External links
 
 

1982 births
Living people
People from Bagnols-sur-Cèze
Sportspeople from Gard
Association football goalkeepers
French footballers
Montpellier HSC players
FC Libourne players
Ligue 1 players
Ligue 2 players
Footballers from Occitania (administrative region)